Ivan Lendl was the defending champion but did not compete that year.

Slobodan Živojinović won in the final 7–6, 6–3, 6–4 against Richard Matuszewski.

Seeds

  Tim Mayotte (semifinals)
  Andrés Gómez (semifinals)
  Darren Cahill (second round)
  John Fitzgerald (second round)
  Slobodan Živojinović (champion)
  John Frawley (first round)
  Eric Jelen (second round)
  Joey Rive (first round)

Draw

Finals

Section 1

Section 2

External links
 1988 Swan Premium Open draw

Singles